The Free Yemeni Movement (al-yamaniyin al-ahrar) was a nationalist political movement active in the politics of North Yemen from the mid-1930s until the 1962 coup which ushered in the Yemen Arab Republic and the 8-year North Yemen Civil War.

The movement began with generalized opposition to the rule of Imam Yahya Muhammad Hamid ed-Din, a conservative ruler who was deeply suspicious of foreign influence and as a result kept his land isolated and deprived of modern technology. He once famously said: "I would rather that my people and I remain poor and eat straw than let foreigners in, or give them concessions, no matter what advantage or wealth might result from their presence." Yahya's motivation was more patriarchal than tyrannical; he believed that as a sayyid it was his responsibility to protect the imamate from infidels and modernity.

After Yemen's defeat by Saudi Arabia in their border war in 1934, rumors arose of a plot among army officers, the Imam's son Ali and Ghalib al-Ahmar of Hashid. In Sana'a and other urban centers a generation of young intellectuals (made up of sons of Yemen officials and large landowners, some of which were graduates of or teacher's at the Imam's schools in Sana'a), known as the shabab, began debating the issues of the day. Reading groups became circles of dissent, and the shabab would become the most ardent critics of Yahya.

The two who would take the first practical steps towards turning dissatisfaction into a mass political movement were Yemenis trained in Cairo, where they were influenced by the Muslim Brotherhood: Muhammad Mahmud al-Zubayri, a poet of the al Qadhi clan and Ahmad Muhammad Numan, a Sunni from the southern highlands. Numan had been in Cairo since 1937, studying at the al-Azhar University, working for Arab nationalists and writing articles and pamphlets critical of the conservative nature of the imamate in Yemen. Numan's complaints involved abuse of authority by local officials, lack of direct appeal for petition to the Imam and oppressive taxation. Numan did not challenge the existence of the imamate and in fact flattered the crown prince, who he believed supported the idea of reform. Zubayri arrived in Cairo in March 1940 and immediately looked up Numan. Over the next year the two founded al-Katiba al-Ula (the "first Battalion"), a discussion group for Yemeni nationals interested in reform. They also contributed articles to Cairo newspapers.

Numan returned to Yemen in February 1941 and was given the office of inspector of primary schools for the Province of Ta'izz by the Crown Prince Ahmad bin Yahya, who was governor at the time. Zubayri remained in Cairo where he continued the discussion group, which he renamed Shabab al-Amr. In addition he wrote a manifesto designed to persuade Imam Yahya the benefits of reform by using Islamic arguments: al-Barnamij al-Awwal min Baramij Shabab al-Amr bi'l-Ma'ruf wa 'l-Nahi 'an al-Mankur ("The First Programme of the Youths for Promoting the Good and Preventing the Bad"). The manifesto, heavily influenced by the Muslim Brotherhood movement in Egypt, had four general goals: (i) return to a pure spirit of Islam; (ii) expansion of education; (iii) economic reforms; and (iv) stronger ties with other Muslim states.

The Imam was not persuaded and instead was so enraged that he charged al-Zubayri with an "offense against Islam." A committee of ulama and other notables was set up to try al-Zubayri on this capital change, but they acquitted him. During the trial supporters among the shabab in Sana'a distributed leaflets protesting the charges. The Imam responded by arresting a number of the shabab. More protests followed, and more arrests. Most were released by April 1942, but Zubayri was not released until September 1942.

On release Zubayri became attached to the court of Crown Prince Ahmad in Ta'izz. Ahmad seemed unperturbed by talk of reform, but he was also highly unstable and volatile. During a discussion In 1944 Ahmad was heard to exclaim, "I pray to God I do not die before I colour my sword here with the blood of these modernists". The outburst caused Nu'man, al-Zubyri and other reformers to quit his court and flee to Aden.

References

Further reading
A. Z. al-Abdim, 'The Free Yemeni Movement (1940-1948) and its ideas on reform', Middle Eastern Studies Vol. 15 No. 1 (1979)
Political parties established in the 1930s
Political parties disestablished in 1962
Arab nationalism in Yemen
Political movements in Yemen